Heinrich Ernst Grosmann   (1732–1811) was a Danish composer. He is best known for his work with Aarhus Cathedral.

Notable works include Paaske Music (1775) and Cantata Paa Christi Himmelfarts Dag. Gud farer op (1791)

See also
List of Danish composers

References
This article was initially translated from the Danish Wikipedia.

Danish classical composers
Male composers
1732 births
1811 deaths